Barquero is a 1970 American Western film starring Lee Van Cleef and Warren Oates directed by Gordon Douglas.

Plot
After stealing a shipment of silver and weapons, the brutal and unstable Remy and his band of mercenaries must cross a river in order to flee into Mexico. Travis, the maverick owner-operator of a barge that ferries people and goods across the river, learns that Remy and his band are on the way. Travis and his woman, Nola, transport the nearby settlement's inhabitants and a group of passing settlers to the river's far side. When Remy and his band arrive, Travis refuses to cross back to pick them up, knowing that Remy and his men will kill everyone else after they cross the river. A tense standoff develops between Remy and his gang, and Travis and the inhabitants and settlers, who occupy opposite sides of the river. Remy is advised by Marquette, a Frenchman he trusts. Travis is greatly assisted by Mountain Phil, a friend of his who is similarly independent-minded in the way he lives. Both Remy and Travis have to contend with dissenters within their own camps. It all explodes into a violent and bloody battle, leading to a final confrontation between the two.

Cast 
 Lee Van Cleef as Travis
 Warren Oates as Remy
 Forrest Tucker as Mountain Phil
 Kerwin Mathews as Marquette
 Mariette Hartley as Anna
 Marie Gomez as Nola
 Armando Silvestre as Sawyer

External links

See also
 List of American films of 1970

References

1970 films
1970 Western (genre) films
American Western (genre) films
1970s English-language films
Films directed by Gordon Douglas
Films scored by Dominic Frontiere
Films shot in Colorado
United Artists films
Revisionist Western (genre) films
1970s American films